The 2015–16 Grambling State Tigers men's basketball team represented Grambling State University during the 2015–16 NCAA Division I men's basketball season. The Tigers, led by second year head coach Shawn Walker, played their home games at the Fredrick C. Hobdy Assembly Center and were members of the Southwestern Athletic Conference. The Tigers finished the regular season with a 7–24 overall record, 4–14 in SWAC play to finish in last place. They lost to Mississippi Valley State in the first round of the SWAC tournament.

Roster

Schedule

|-
!colspan=9 style="background:#000000; color:#D9D919;"| Regular season

|-
!colspan=9 style="background:#000000; color:#D9D919;"| SWAC tournament

References

Grambling State Tigers men's basketball seasons
Grambling State
Grambling State Tigers men's basketball
Grambling State Tigers men's basketball